Joe Golem is a novel and comic book series created by Mike Mignola and Christopher Golden. It began with a promotional short story, Joe Golem and the Copper Girl, followed by an illustrated novel, Joe Golem and the Drowning City in 2012, both published by St. Martin's Press. The series was expanded as a comic book series published by Dark Horse Comics from 2015 to 2019. The series follows Joe, an occult detective in New York City during the 1960s and '70s. The Joe Golem series is set in The Outerverse, a shared universe with Baltimore (a 2007 novel by Mignola and Golden and its comic book continuation), and other series.

Comics
In 2015 Dark Horse Comics began the comic series Joe Golem: Occult Detective. The first ten issues were set in the decade preceding the events of the original novel, while the next ten retell the novel.  Joe Golem is a series of miniseries, with each miniseries having its own numbering, but each issue also has an ongoing overall numbering on the inside front cover.

Issues

Collected editions
The comic book series has been collected in hardcover volumes.

References

2012 books
2015 comics debuts
Alternate history comics
American alternate history novels
Dark Horse Comics limited series
Golem, Joe
Golem, Joe
Golem, Joe
St. Martin's Press books